Amalie Lutro (born 15 March 2000) is a Norwegian professional racing cyclist, who currently rides for UCI Women's Continental Team .

References

External links

2000 births
Living people
Norwegian female cyclists
Place of birth missing (living people)
21st-century Norwegian women